The 2015–16 Emporia State Lady Hornets basketball team represented Emporia State University in the 2015–16 NCAA Division II women's basketball season, which was the 42nd Lady Hornets basketball season. The Lady Hornets were led by 6th year head coach, Jory Collins. The team played its home games on Slaymaker Court at William L. White Auditorium in Emporia, Kansas, its home court since 1974. Emporia State is a member of the Mid-America Intercollegiate Athletics Association.

Preseason outlook
The Lady Hornets were chosen as the favorite to win in the D-II Bulletin Preseason National Poll that was released on October 5, 2015. The only other MIAA member ranked was Fort Hays State at #5. On October 22, 2015, the MIAA released its Preseason Coaches Poll, with the Lady Hornets tabbed as the favorite to win.

On November 3, 2015, the Women's Basketball Coaches Association released their preseason poll with Emporia State as the top ranked team.

2015–16 Roster

Media
The Lady Hornets basketball games are broadcast on KFFX-FM, Mix 104.9.

Schedule
Source: 

|-
!colspan=12 style="background:#000000; color:white;"|Exhibition

|-
!colspan=12 style="background:#000000; color:white;"|Non-Conference regular season

|-
!colspan=12 style="background:#000000; color:white;"|MIAA regular season

|-
!colspan=6 style="background:#000000; color:white;"|2016 MIAA Tournament

|-
!colspan=6 style="background:#000000; color:white;"|2016 NCAA Tournament

Rankings

References

Emporia State Lady Hornets basketball seasons
2015 in sports in Kansas
2016 in sports in Kansas